Le Petit Séminaire de Québec, campus de l'Outaouais is a private French language college in Gatineau, Quebec, Canada. It offers a secondary school International Baccalaureate program as well as the post-secondary Diploma of Collegial Studies.

It was founded in 1996 by Le Petit Séminaire de Québec, a Quebec City based private high school after numerous demands from Outaouais parents and students who wished to have an International Baccalaureate school in their region. It is one of three private colleges making up the Multicollège group.

See also

List of colleges in Quebec 
Higher education in Quebec

References

External links
Le Petit Séminaire de Québec Website 
Multicollège Website 

Private subsidized colleges in Quebec
Private schools in Quebec
Educational institutions established in 1996
International Baccalaureate schools in Quebec
Education in Gatineau
1996 establishments in Quebec